Cloeosiphon is a genus of worms belonging to the family Aspidosiphonidae.

The species of this genus are found in Indian and Pacific Ocean.

Species:
 Cloeosiphon aspergillus (Quatrefages, 1865)

References

Sipunculans